L'amant anonyme (The Anonymous Lover) is a 1780 opéra comique in two acts with ballet by Chevalier de Saint-Georges, to a libretto by Desfontaines-Lavallée based on a play by Madame de Genlis. L'amant is Saint-Georges' sole surviving opera.

The story concerns a wealthy young widow, Leontine, who resists suggestions that she fall in love again after a cold marriage to her late husband. She has been receiving gifts and love letters from an anonymous admirer, who is in actuality her good friend Valcour.  Valcour, however, is of lower birth and is afraid Leontine could never love him.  So he hides his feelings and tells her that he also is closed to love.  Still, he clumsily tries to reveal himself through mutual friends just as Leontine is trying to meet the Anonymous Lover herself.  Eventually all is revealed and they give themselves to love.

Recording
Joseph Bologne, Saint-Georges: L’amant Anonyme Nicole Cabell (Léontine), Geoffrey Agpalo (Valcour), David Govertsen (Ophémon), Erica Schuller (Jeannette), Michael St. Peter (Colin), Nathalie Colas (Dorothée) Haymarket Opera Company, Craig Trompeter. Cedille Length: 2 hours 49 minutes

References

1780 operas
French-language operas
Operas based on plays
Operas